IHS Press is a publishing house based in Virginia whose mission is to promote the social teaching of the Catholic Church. The name "IHS" is a truncation of the first three letters of the Greek name of Jesus Christ.  IHS Press has been concerned with the promotion of the social teaching as laid down by Pope Leo XIII in his encyclical Rerum novarum. IHS Press has thus been primarily focused on reprinting the rarer works of authors who promote a third-way between capitalism and socialism such as G. K. Chesterton and Hilaire Belloc, along with those of such older guild theorists as Arthur Penty and Heinrich Pesch.

IHS Press is currently chaired by John Sharpe.

In 2005, IHS Press launched a new imprint, Light in the Darkness Publications (LID), to print more miscellaneous works for a more general audience but still serving the larger goal of promoting the social teaching.  LID will also be particularly dedicated to bringing about a well defined perspective on contemporary politics which might also serve as a basis for serious organization.  LID's first publication has been Neo-Conned!, a two volume compendium of essays opposing the Iraq War containing a vast array of authors from Noam Chomsky and Alexander Cockburn on the left to Pat Buchanan and Samuel T. Francis on the right.  Neo-Conned! contains the last original published work of both Francis and Jude Wanniski.

IHS Press is designated as a hate group by the Southern Poverty Law Center.

References

External links
 Official Website
 Website for Neo-Conned!

Anti–Iraq War groups
Catholic lay organisations
Catholic media